Jeyhun Aziz oglu Bayramov is an Azerbaijani politician who currently has served the Minister of Foreign Affairs of the Republic of Azerbaijan since 2020. Bayramov previously served as the Minister of Education from 2018 to 2020.

Early life and career
Bayramov earned a law degree from Azerbaijan University and holds a degree in economics from the Azerbaijan State University of Economics. He worked at various positions at the Ministry of Taxes between 1996 and 2000. He continued his career as a lawyer in “Salans Hertzfeld & Heilbronn (Baku) Limited” in 2000-2002. He was the Director of the “OMNI” law firm until 2013. He has regularly appeared on the “Chambers Global”, “IFLR1000” and “Legal500” list of leading tax and civil rights lawyers in Azerbaijan.

Bayramov returned to the civil service as the Chief of Staff of the Ministry of Education on 30 May 2013 and served until 12 August 2013. He was appointed the Deputy Minister of Education by the decree of President Ilham Aliyev on 12 August 2013. He was promoted and appointed as the Minister of Education by order of President Aliyev on 23 April 2018. On 16 July 2020, Bayramov was appointed as the Minister of Foreign Affairs.

See also
 List of current foreign ministers

References

External links

1973 births
Living people
Lawyers from Baku
Politicians from Baku
Ministers of Foreign Affairs of Azerbaijan
Education ministers of Azerbaijan
Government ministers of Azerbaijan
Azerbaijan State University of Economics alumni
20th-century Azerbaijani lawyers
21st-century Azerbaijani lawyers
21st-century Azerbaijani politicians